Paul W. Barry, a.k.a. Uncle Bill, was an American polo player.

Biography
He held a seven-goal rating in 1948, 1949, 1955, 1956 and 1957. He won Camacho Cup as part of the USA team in 1946, the Butler Handicap in 1954, the National 20-Goal (Silver Cup) in 1954, the U.S. Open Polo Championship in 1955, and the National 12-Goal in 1957. He was known as a "cowboy" polo player because he came from the Western United States.

He was inducted into the Museum of Polo and Hall of Fame on February 17, 2006.

References

American polo players
Year of birth missing (living people)